Dave Cutler is a software engineer, designer and developer of several operating systems.

Dave or David Cutler may also refer to:

Dave Cutler (Canadian football) (born 1945), place kicker with the Edmonton Eskimos
David Cutler (born 1965), economist and professor at Harvard University
David Cutler Group, housebuilding company
David Cutler (bowls) (born 1954), British bowler
David F. Cutler (born 1939), British botanist

Cutler, Dave